Mosteiro, Portuguese for monastery, may refer to the following places in Portugal:

 Mosteiro (Lajes das Flores), a civil parish in the municipality of Lajes das Flores, Azores
 Mosteiró (Santa Maria da Feira), a parish in the municipality of Santa Maria da Feira
 Mosteiro (Oleiros), a civil parish in the municipality of Oleiros 
 Mosteiro (Torre de Dona Chama), a village in the parish of Torre de Dona Chama
 Mosteiro (Vieira do Minho), a parish in the municipality of Vieira do Minho
 Mosteiró (Vila do Conde), a parish in the municipality of Vila do Conde

See also
 Mosteiros (disambiguation)